was a professional wrestling event promoted by DDT Pro-Wrestling (DDT). The event took place on August 23, 2015, in Tokyo at the Ryōgoku Kokugikan. The event featured ten matches, five of which were contested for championships. The event aired live on Fighting TV Samurai and later on TV Tokyo, on October 18.

Storylines
The Ryōgoku Peter Pan 2015 event featured ten professional wrestling matches that involved different wrestlers from pre-existing scripted feuds and storylines. Wrestlers portrayed villains, heroes, or less distinguishable characters in the scripted events that built tension and culminated in a wrestling match or series of matches.

On February 7, 2015, it was reported that Genichiro Tenryu had decided to retire from professional wrestling with his final match scheduled to take place later in the year. In the meantime, he embarked on a multipromotional "Retirement Road" tour that would make a stop at Ryōgoku Peter Pan 2015.

By winning the King of DDT tournament on June 28, Yukio Sakaguchi earned a title match in the main event against KO-D Openweight Champion Kudo.

Event
The dark match was a King of Dark Championship match between "Hollywood" Stalker Ichikawa from Dragon Gate and Gota Ihashi. Per the rules of the championship, losing the match caused Ihashi to retain the title.

On the main card, the second match of the evening was the debut match of Mao Inoue and Mizuki Watase.

The next match was a Rumble rules match in which tag teams competed by entering the match one after another at regular intervals. Amongst the participants were Great Kojika from Big Japan Pro Wrestling who teamed up with Gorgeous Matsuno, and Aja Kong from Oz Academy who teamed up with Makoto Oishi. The match also saw the professional wrestling debut of LiLiCo, a comedian and TV personality who had already taken part in several DDT events in previous years. 

The next match was a "Blindfold Bra Stripping Tiger Trap Deathmatch" sponsored by Uchicomi! in which Antonio Honda defended the DDT Extreme Championship against Masa Takanashi. In this match, both participants were blindfolded, wore a bra and a giant tiger trap was set up in the middle of the ring. There were no pinfalls or submissions and the winner would be the first to completely remove their opponent's bra.

In the next match Tetsuya Endo made his return after suffering a leg injury in April.

The next match was the sixteenth match of the "Genichiro Tenryu Retirement Road" tour that saw the participation of Meiko Satomura from Sendai Girls' Pro Wrestling.

The eighth match saw Strong BJ (Daisuke Sekimoto and Yuji Okabayashi) from Big Japan Pro Wrestling defend the KO-D Tag Team Championship against the Golden☆Storm Riders (Kota Ibushi and Daisuke Sasaki).

In the next match, Harashima faced Hiroshi Tanahashi from New Japan Pro-Wrestling.

Results

Rumble rules match

References

External links
The official DDT Pro-Wrestling website
Ryōgoku Peter Pan 2015 at ProWrestlingHistory.com

DDT Peter Pan
2015 in professional wrestling
August 2015 events in Japan
Professional wrestling in Tokyo
2015 in Tokyo
Events in Tokyo